The 2019 Liga 2 was the third season of the Liga 2 under its current name and the 10th season under its current league structure.

Persik won the title after a 3–2 win over Persita in the final at Kapten I Wayan Dipta Stadium, Gianyar on 25 November 2019.

Teams

Team changes
The following teams have changed division since the 2018 season.

Name changes
 Aceh United merged with PS Timah Babel into Babel United and relocated to Pangkal Pinang.
 Bogor relocated to Manado and were renamed to Sulut United.
 Blitar United relocated to Bandung and became the reserve team of Persib named Bandung United.

Stadiums and locations

Notes:

Personnel and kits
Note: Flags indicate national team as has been defined under FIFA eligibility rules. Players and coaches may hold more than one non-FIFA nationality.

Notes:

 On the front of shirt.
 On the back of shirt.
 On the sleeves.
 On the shorts.

Coaching changes

Notes:

First round

West region

East region

Second round
This round was played on 9–17 November 2019. Eight teams competed in this round. All groups was played on a single-game round-robin home tournament. The winners and runner-ups from each group advanced to semi-finals.

Group X
 Five matches were held at Gelora Delta Stadium, Sidoarjo and one match was held at Gelora Joko Samudro Stadium, Gresik.
 Times listed are UTC+7.

Group Y
 Five matches were held at Gelora Sriwijaya Stadium, Palembang and one match was held at Bumi Sriwijaya Stadium, Palembang.
 Times listed are UTC+7.

Knockout round 
All times listed below are UTC+8.

Bracket

Semi-finals

Third place

Final

Top goalscorers

See also
 2019 Liga 1
 2019 Liga 3
 2018–19 Piala Indonesia

References

Liga 2
Liga 2
Liga 2
Indonesia